Connor House may refer to:

Connor House (Yuma, Arizona), listed on the National Register of Historic Places (NRHP) in Yuma County
Connor House (Rock Island, Illinois), listed on the NRHP
Connor-Bovie House, Fairfield, Maine, listed on the NRHP in Somerset County
Burton-Conner_House, Cambridge, Massachusetts
Connor Toll House in Signal Mountain, Tennessee, listed on the NRHP in Hamilton County

See also
Conner House (disambiguation)